OXES is an American instrumental rock band from Baltimore. 'OXES' is a part of what is known as "The Baltimore Rowdy Collective" which stages practical jokes, usually involving a confrontational and outlandish racket in public places.

Biography

Live shows
The band performed at the ATP Nightmare Before Christmas festival in Minehead, England in December 2011.

The OXES/Arab on Radar split 10-inch
Prior to the release of their eight-track album OXXXES in 2002, the band put out a 10-inch record, billed as a split EP between OXES and Rhode Island noise-rockers Arab on Radar. The A-side of the record was performed by OXES. However, the B-side was also OXES—this time convincingly impersonating Arab on Radar.

Members
Marc Miller – guitar
Natalio Fowler – guitar
Christopher Freeland – drums

Discography

(1999) Panda Strong 7-inch (Reptilian Records)
(1999) split EP with "Big'n" (Box Factory Records)
(2000) OXES (Monitor Records)
(2000) split 10-inch with Arab on Radar (Wantage Records)
(2002) 7-inch single "Half Half And Half" b/w "Everlong" (Monitor Records)
(2002) OXXXES LP (Monitor Records)
(2005) OXES EP (Monitor Records)
(2011) "Bile Stbudy" 12-inch EP (Friends Records)
(2011) "Orange Jewelryist" 12-inch EP (Africantape)
(2011) "Crunchy Zest" 12-inch EP (Africantape)
(2012) split 7-inch single with "Microkingdom" (Friends Records)

See also
Cass McCombs
Battles

References

External links
OXES' interview on Cult Cargo
OXES

OXES on Myspace
OXES Keeping It Peel on BBC Radio 1

American instrumental musical groups
Heavy metal musical groups from Maryland
Math rock groups